Forest Of The Dead is a 2007 horror film directed by Brian Singleton, starring Chris Anderson and Brandi Boulet.

Plot
George, his wife Eleanor, his brother Sam, Sam's wife Carry, and his daughter Maya are on their way to a family reunion, however they decide to stay at an abandoned campsite for the night. On their way there, they encounter a group of college students. After they arrive, George takes Eleanor fishing while Maya goes swimming and Sam and Carry have sex in a tent. However, soon, a massive fog sets in. Maya heads back to the campsite and hears screaming. When she arrives, she sees Sam being horribly dismembered. Maya flees back into the woods and encounters her parents. She tells them about Sam's death, but they are skeptical. Then, Carry's severed head lands next to them and Eleanor is attacked and killed by an unseen monster. George and Maya flee and attempt to barricade themselves inside a cave, but George is dragged into the fog and killed. Maya successfully closes off the entrance to the cave, but hears another monster behind her and screams before the screen cuts to the title.

The next day, the seven college students arrive at the same campsite. After they set up the tents, the couples have sex. Dan and Molly have sex in a canoe and Larry and Brandy have sex while skinny dipping. Meanwhile, the single members of the group (Leslie, Mike and Jona) explore the same cave from earlier in the film and Jona tells Leslie that she is in love with Dan. They then find Maya barely alive. She promptly turns into a zombie and bites Mike before Jona beats her to death with a rock. Mike, due to being bitten, turns into a zombie and is killed by Leslie. Leslie and Jona exit the cave and are chased by more zombies, with Leslie killing the reanimated George. They then split up to find the others.

Leslie attempts to save Larry and Brandy by paddling out to them on a raft, but reanimated corpses in the lake kill Larry. After Leslie pulls Brandy onto the raft, Brandy discovers that she was bitten, and Leslie mercy kills her with a knife. Meanwhile, Jona helps Dan and Molly out of the canoe. Dan and Jona race ahead, while Molly lags behind. Jona goes back to help her, but instead kills her by stabbing her in the neck with a stick, and tells Dan that she was eaten by zombies.

Dan and Jona run through the woods for several hours and finally make it to a road and celebrate by making out. They see a car coming and think that they are saved, but they soon realize that the driver is a zombie. The car veers off the road, hitting and killing Dan. The zombies chase Jona back to the canoe, where a crowd of zombies, including a reanimated Molly, rip Jona to shreds.

Leslie discovered an abandoned military base in the woods, where she fins an old grenade. Leslie repairs an old armored vehicle and tries to use it to escape, but the car is blocked by a swarm of zombies. She is able to blow up enough zombies with the grenade so that she is able to get away. Leslie drives to the city, only to discover that it has been overrun with zombies. She is last seen driving into the desert, with her ultimate fate being left uncertain.

Trivia
Forest of the Dead was complete on January, 2002. In 2005, 5 new scenes were shot for a director's cut. Due to various technical difficulties, the film had to be re-cut from scratch by Brian Singleton in 2005. It took 5 months to finish and was then submitted to Elite Entertainment, who then signed for its release in 2007.

External links
 
 

2007 horror films
2007 films
Canadian splatter films
English-language Canadian films
2000s English-language films
2000s Canadian films